A European Union laissez-passer is a travel document issued to civil servants and members of the institutions of the European Union. It is proof of privileges and immunities the holders enjoy. The document is valid in all countries of the European Union as well as in over 100 other countries. In 2006, the European Commission issued or renewed 2,200 laissez-passer, and other agencies may issue the document as well.

The present regulation was proposed by the European Commission implementing machine-readable laissez-passer according to ICAO 9303 standard including a digitized photo of the bearer's face and fingerprints. The number of data fields was reduced and the document no longer contains information on address and physical appearance.

History
Provisions for issuing laissez-passer were already present in the treaties establishing of the European Coal and Steel Community, the European Atomic Energy Community and the European Economic Community and a single European Community laissez-passer was established at the beginning of the 1970s. As a result of the Maastricht Treaty, the name was changed to European Union laissez-passer. The initial laissez-passer was available in all four languages of the communities (French, German, Dutch and Italian), but not in English. Subsequent extensions changed the number of languages to the  present 24.

Appearance
The document contains 48 pages and all text is in all 24 official languages. 

A data page has a visual zone and a machine-readable zone. The visual zone has a photograph of the holder, data about the passport, and data about the LP holder much similar to a normal passport. The nationality and place of birth of the passport holder is not mentioned in an EULP, but the code EUE is used in fields similar to issuing country.

 Photograph
 Type [of document, which is "PL"]
 Code [of the issuing organization, which is "EUE" for "European Union"]
 Laissez-passer No.
 Surname
 Given Name(s)
 Official of / Nationality [EUE / nationality code]
 Date of Birth
 Sex
 Date of Issue
 Date of Expiry
 Signature

The first line of a machine-readable zone (which is at the bottom of the page) of the passport contains a letter to denote the type of travel document (which is "PL"), followed by the code normally used for the issuing country (but here: "EUE" for "European Union"), and the name (surname first, then given name or names) of the passport holder.

In a similar fashion to most passports, the EU laissez-passer contains a request:

See also
United Nations laissez-passer 
Passports of the European Union
PRADO - Public Register of Travel and Identity Documents Online

References

External links
Legislation
 Council Regulation (EU) No 1417/2013 of 17 December 2013 laying down the form of the laissez-passer issued by the European Union
 Consolidated version of regulation (EU) No 1417/2013 containing corrections (as of 28 December 2013)
Printer
Laissez-passer.eu

European Union
International travel documents
Travel documents issued by international organizations